WCHS (580 kHz) is a news/talk/sports formatted broadcast radio station licensed to Charleston, West Virginia, serving Southern West Virginia and Southwestern West Virginia.  WCHS is owned and operated by WVRC Media.

WCHS-AM is the Primary Entry Point Emergency Alert System station for West Virginia.

FM Translators
In addition to the main station broadcasting at 580 kHz, WCHS is relayed by two FM translators which are used to widen its broadcast area.

Programming
WCHS is the flagship station of the statewide West Virginia MetroNews network. Prior to the mid-1990s switch to talk radio, WCHS was Charleston's oldies station; the oldies format would move to 107.3 WKAZ-FM.

Programming heard on WCHS consists of local and national news, talk and sports programs.  The station's weekday morning schedule begins with the nationally syndicated "America in the Morning".  "The Morning News" hosted by West Virginia MetroNews anchors Chris Lawrence and Shauna Johnson follows.  A locally produced "Ask The Expert" then airs, followed by "MetroNews Talkline" hosted by Hoppy Kercheval.

The weekday afternoon lineup beings with the nationally syndicated Rush Limbaugh Show.  "MetroNews Hotline" and "MetroNews Sportsline", hosted by Dave Weekley and Tony Caridi respectively, round out the afternoon.  Various sports programs air in the evenings, with Dave Ramsey Show and "The Jim Bohannon Show" rounding out the night.  Red Eye Radio is heard during the overnight hours.

The weekend lineup includes nationally syndicated shows from John Batchelor and Kim Komando.  "West Virginia Outdoors" and "Sunday Sportsline", hosted by Chris Lawrence and Travis Jones respectively, are also heard.  "The Don Nehlen and Bob Pruett Show" also airs on WCHS.  The program is hosted by former West Virginia Mountaineers football head coach Don Nehlen and former Marshall University football head coach Bob Pruett.

Various programs, produced by West Virginia MetroNews, cover high school sports either live or with highlights during the week.  The "MetroNews High School Scoreboard" airs highlights of games already played or to-be-played around the state.  "High School Sportsline" is a mid-week call-in show, hosted by Garrett Cullen, exclusively about high school sports.  "High School Game Night" is a live Friday evening program which features continuous score updates, interviews, and analysis.

WCHS is also an affiliate of the Cincinnati Reds Radio Network

Awards
A 1942 Peabody Award for Outstanding Public Service by a Regional Station for "The Home Front," a twice-weekly feature.
  
A 2007 National Edward R. Murrow Award, in the category of "Continuing Coverage", for their reporting on the Sago Mine disaster in Sago, West Virginia.

The station was presented with two 2011 Regional Edward R. Murrow Awards.  The first, in the category of "Breaking News Coverage", was given for the station's coverage of the Upper Big Branch Mine disaster in Montcoal, West Virginia.  The second, in the category of "Audio News Documentary", was for "The Life of U.S. Senator Robert C. Byrd".

In 2011, the station was presented with a National Edward R. Murrow Award, for their Upper Big Branch Mine disaster coverage.  WCHS, along with four other stations, were nominated for the 2011 Marconi Radio Award for "News/Talk Station of the Year" by the National Association of Broadcasters.  WSB in Atlanta, however, won the award.

In 2014, WCHS anchors and reports Chris Lawrence, Fred Persinger, Jeff Jenkins, Shauna Johnson, and Hoppy Kercheval were presented with various awards at that year's West Virginia Broadcasters Association "Excellence in Broadcasting Awards".

In 2015, the station was again presented with two Regional Edward R. Murrow Awards, one for "Overall Excellence" and the other for "Best Newscast".

References

External links
 96.5 FM 580 AM WCHS Online

1927 establishments in West Virginia
News and talk radio stations in the United States
Sports radio stations in the United States
Radio stations established in 1927
CHS
CHS